Club Deportivo Santa Marta was a football team based in Santa Marta de los Barros in the autonomous community of Extremadura. Established in 1970, it was disbanded during 2012 summer due to financial constraints.

Its greatest achievement was having played four season in Tercera División.

Season to season

4 seasons in Tercera División

References

External links
fexfutbol.com profile
Futbolme.com profile 

Defunct football clubs in Extremadura
Association football clubs established in 1970
Association football clubs disestablished in 2012
Divisiones Regionales de Fútbol clubs
1970 establishments in Spain